T. arenarius  may refer to:
 Taterillus arenarius, the Robbins's tateril or Sahel gerbil, a rodent species found only in Mauritania
 Triaeniopholis arenarius, a synonym for Lampropeltis getula, the eastern kingsnake, common kingsnake or chain kingsnake, a harmless colubrid species found in the United States and Mexico

See also
 Arenarius (disambiguation)